Sabroe is a surname. Notable people with the surname include:

Andreas Sabroe (born 1982), Danish ice hockey player
Peter Sabroe (1867–1913), Danish journalist, politician, and children's rights advocate